The China University of Geosciences (abbreviated 地大 or CUG) is a key national university directly under the administration of the Education Ministry of the People's Republic of China. It is located in Wuhan, the capital of Central China's Hubei Province. It is a Chinese state Double First Class University Plan university identified by the Ministry of Education.

It is regarded as one of the top geosciences university in China and exerts considerable influence on the Chinese mining and oil industry. Its notable alumni include Wen Jiabao, the Premier of China's State Council between 2003 and 2013, who attended the China University of Geosciences when it was known as the Beijing Institute of Geology (BIG). The motto "Being austere and simple, keeping on practice and acting for truth" is from him.

Campuses

Main Campus(Nanwangshan Mountain Campus) 
The Main Campus of CUG is referred to as Nanwangshan Mountain Campus，because the campus was located at the foot of Nanwangshan mountain and it also has a tunnel which connect west campus and north campus running through the mountain. It has a large annual enrollment and has a wide range of courses other than geosciences. Its Yifu Museum (donated by Sir Run Run Shaw) is known for housing China's top ranked displays of dinosaur fossils, mineral and rock specimens.

New Campus(Future City Campus) 
The New Campus of CUG was built in the Future technology city of Wuhan.This campus is equipped with perfect infrastructure.

History

1952–1970，Beijing Institute of Geology 
The history of China University of Geosciences dates back to Beijing Institute of Geology (BIG) which was a merger of the geology departments of Tsinghua University, Peking University, Tianjin University and Tangshan Railway College in 1952. It was among China's first 16 key universities back in the 1950s. The university suspended operations from 1966 to 1970 due to the Cultural Revolution.

1970–1975 Hubei College of Geology 
In 1970, the school reopened in Jiangling County, Hubei Province as Hubei College of Geology.

1975–1987 Wuhan College of Geology 
In 1975 the campus was moved to Wuhan, and the school was renamed Wuhan College of Geology (WCG). In 1978 BIG reopened in Beijing with the help of Deng Xiaoping. In 1986 the Chinese Government ratified the foundation of the Beijing Graduate School of WCG. It was ranked as one of the first 33 Graduate Schools nationwide.

1987–present China University of Geosciences 
Later in 1987, WCG was renamed China University of Geosciences, and its branch campus in Beijing was renamed the Beijing Graduate School of China University of Geosciences. In 2005, the two campuses in Wuhan and Beijing were separated into two individual entities and renamed China University of Geosciences (CUG) and China University of Geosciences (Beijing) (CUGB), respectively. CUG is included in the Chinese state Double First Class University Plan.

Schools
 School of Earth Sciences
 School of Earth Resources
 Faculty of Material Science and Chemistry
 School of Environmental Studies
 Faculty of Engineering
 Institute of Geophysics and Geomatics
 College of Marine Science and Technology
 School of Mechanical Engineering and Electronic Information
 School of Automation
 School of Economics and Management
 School of Foreign Languages
 School of Geography and Information Engineering
 School of Mathematics and Physics
 Gemological Institute
 School of Public Administration
 School of Computer Science
 School of Physical Education
 School of Arts and Communication
 School of Marxism
 School of Li Siguang
 Institute of Higher Education
 Distance Learning and Continuing Education College
 International Education College

Laboratories

National-level laboratories
 State Key Laboratory of geological processes and mineral resources (GPMR)
 State key Laboratory of Biogeology and Environmental Geology (BGEG)
 National Engineering Research Center for Geographic Information System

Provincial or ministerial-level laboratories
 Key Laboratory of Tectonics and Petroleum Resources, Ministry of Education
 Three Gorges Research Center for Geohazards, Ministry of Education
 Key Laboratory of legal evaluation engineering of Ministry of land and resources
 Engineering Research Center for nano mineral materials and applications, Ministry of Education

Field Training Centers 
 Zhoukoudian Field Training Center, located in Zhoukoudian, Beijing.
 Beidaihe Field Training Center, located in Qinhuangdao, Hebei.
 Zigui Field Training Center, located in Zigui County, Hubei.

Journals
 Earth Science (in Chinese, ; Ei Compendex)
 Journal of Earth Science (in English, ; SCIE)

Image gallery

Famous alumni
 Wen Jiabao (graduated 1965, 1968), former premier of China
 Ouyang Ziyuan (graduated 1956), chief scientist of Chinese Lunar Exploration Program
 Zhang Hongren (graduated 1954), former president of International Union of Geological Sciences (IUGS)
 Wang Anshun (graduated 1983), mayor of Beijing (2012–2016)
 Wang Fuzhou (graduated 1958), Chinese mountain climber
 Wang Yongfeng (graduated 1984), Chinese mountain climber
 Li Zhixin (graduated 1985), Chinese mountaineer
 Zhang Wenyue (graduated 1967), governor of Liaoning Province
 Sun Jinlong (graduated 1982, 1986), governor of Anhui Province
 Hua-Wei Zhou (graduated 1980), American geophysicist
 Gao Ling (graduated 2004), badminton player

Notable faculty

See also

China University of Geosciences (Beijing)
Geology of China
China Geological Survey
Geological Museum of China
Wen Jiabao
Double First Class University Plan
Project 211
Project 985
C9 League
China Open Resources for Education
Education in the People's Republic of China
OpenCourseWare in China
Worldwide Universities Network
List of colleges and universities
List of schools of Journalism and Communication in China
National Higher Education Entrance Examination
International Alliance of Research Universities
Universitas 21
Workshop on building top-class universities
Worldwide Universities Network

References

External links
 Official website (in Chinese)
 Official website (in English)

Project 211
Educational institutions established in 1952
Wuhan
1952 establishments in China
Geology of China
Geology education
Universities and colleges in Wuhan